Bolduc is a surname. Notable people with the surname include:

 Blanche Bolduc (1906 or 1907 – 1998), Canadian folk artist
 Dan Bolduc (born 1953), American ice hockey player
 Don Bolduc (born 1962), American politician and retired general
 Jean-Baptiste-Zacharie Bolduc (1818–1889), Canadian Jesuit
 Joseph Bolduc (1847–1924), Canadian politician
 Nicolas Bolduc (born 1973), cinematographer
 Roch Bolduc (born 1928), Canadian politician
 Yves Bolduc (born 1957), Canadian politician and doctor
 La Bolduc (Mary Rose-Anna Bolduc née Travers, 1894–1941), Canadian singer and musician